This is a list of American football players who have played for the Boston Bulldogs in the National Football League (NFL).  It includes players that have played at least one match in the NFL regular season.  The Boston Bulldogs team was founded in 1929 and lasted until the end of that season when the team folded. The team was called the Pottsville Maroons from 1920 until 1928.



C
Joe Carpe,
Bill Connor

E
Jack Ernst

H
Bill Howell

K
George Kenneally,
Paul Kitteredge,
Joe Kozlowsky,

L
Tony Latone,
Ed Lawrence

M
Red Maloney,
Ralph Marston,
Ed McCrillis,
Pete Merloni,
Al Miller

P
Al Pierotti

R
Frank Racis,
Dick Rauch

S
Roy Scholl, 
Arnie Shockley, 
Bert Shurtleff, 
Hust Stockton

T
Thurston Towle

W
Cy Wentworth

References

 

 
Boston B